Maya Capital is a specialist real estate and private equity investment firm based in London. Founded in 2014, the Pan-European firm's major activities to date have concentrated on investment in UK real estate outside London. Their strategy focuses on creating initiatives, such as asset repositioning, financial structuring, property development, and seeking opportunities resulting from special situations.

In February 2015, Maya Capital closed a £6m investment in Swansea consisting of a 66,800 sq ft office building let entirely to the DVLA with 4.5 years of lease remaining at a yield of 10%. Maya Capital was advised on the transaction by Gerald Eve LLP and Mishcon de Reya.

Maya Capital has also completed 15 million pounds of investments within the M25, including the acquisition and sale of Countryside House, an office building in Brentwood in the summer of 2014; and the acquisition of 160-163 Friar Street, an office building in Reading, Berkshire in October 2014.

References

External links
Maya Capital (company website)

Private equity firms